The brown-cheeked fulvetta (Alcippe poioicephala) or brown-cheeked alcippe as the fulvettas proper are not closely related to this species,) is included in the family Alcippeidae. It was earlier also known as the quaker babbler.

This species is one of those retained in the genus Alcippe after the true fulvettas and some others were removed; the group had turned out to contain quite unrelated birds. Its closest relatives are probably the brown fulvetta and the black-browed fulvetta, which was only recently recognized as a distinct species again. The Javan fulvetta and the Nepal fulvetta might also belong to this group.

The brown-cheeked fulvetta is a resident breeding bird in Bangladesh, India and Southeast Asia. Its habitat is undergrowth in moist forests and scrub jungle. This species, like most babblers, is not migratory, and has short rounded wings and a weak flight.

This babbler builds its nest in trees, concealed in dense masses of foliage. The normal clutch is two or three eggs.

The brown-cheeked fulvetta measures 15 cm including its longish tail. It is brown above and buff, with no patterning on the body or wings. The crown is grey, and the cheeks are dark.

Brown-cheeked fulvettas have short, dark bills. Their food is mainly insects and nectar. They can be difficult to observe in the dense vegetation they prefer, but these are vocal birds, and their characteristic calls are often the best indication that they are present.

Nesting
The brown-cheeked fulvetta nests from January to June with a peak in January–February. In a study by Anoop Das and Vijayan, a total of 38 nests were found in 50,000 square metres. The nest is a cup, built with green moss, rootlets, lichen, leaves, and grass lined with rootlets and placed in a fork or suspended from the twigs at a mean height of 68.21 cm from ground. Mean nest width was 91.8 mm and depth 48.7 mm.

Clutch size was two to three eggs and the incubation period is 10 ± 2 days and the nestling period is 12 ± 2 days. Hatching success was 55% while the nestling success was 32%. The most preferred plants for nesting were shrubs of the species Lasianthus ciliatus (36%) followed by the Saprosma fragrans (27%) and Thottea siliquosa (23%).

They tended to locate their nests at central position just near the main stem. A principal component analysis of the nest site variables showed nest height, concealment, plant height and canopy cover as the major parameters in nest site selection, explaining 73% cumulative variance. Of these the crucial deciding factors were plant height and canopy cover when the nest sites were compared with the random sites (discriminant function analysis).

Nest success was directly correlated with concealment as it reduces the chance for predation. Nest site selection of this bird thus shows the choice of a particular location for successful nesting, which is a dense evergreen forest with dense shrub cover and without much disturbance.

Gallery

References

Bibliography
Collar, N. J. & Robson C. 2007. Family Timaliidae (Babblers)  pp. 70 – 291 in; del Hoyo, J., Elliott, A. & Christie, D.A. eds. Handbook of the Birds of the World, Vol. 12. Picathartes to Tits and Chickadees. Lynx Edicions, Barcelona.
Grimmett, Richard; Inskipp, Carol, Inskipp, Tim & Byers, Clive (1999): Birds of India, Pakistan, Nepal, Bangladesh, Bhutan, Sri Lanka, and the Maldives. Princeton University Press, Princeton, N.J.. 
Kazmierczak, Krys & van Perlo, Ber (2000): A Field Guide to the Birds of the Indian Subcontinent. Pica Press, Sussex. 
Pasquet, Eric; Bourdon, Estelle; Kalyakin, Mikhail V. & Cibois, Alice (2006). The fulvettas (Alcippe), Timaliidae, Aves): a polyphyletic group. Zoologica Scripta 35, 559–566.  (HTML abstract)

brown-cheeked fulvetta
Birds of India
Birds of Southeast Asia
Birds of Yunnan
brown-cheeked fulvetta